Karl Wolf (11 February 1912 – 1 March 1975) was a German athlete. He competed in the men's hammer throw at the 1952 Summer Olympics.

References

1912 births
1975 deaths
People from Ladenburg
Sportspeople from Karlsruhe (region)
People from the Grand Duchy of Baden
Athletes (track and field) at the 1952 Summer Olympics
German male hammer throwers
Olympic athletes of Germany